Valday is the name of several inhabited localities in Russia.

Urban localities
Valday, Novgorod Oblast, a town in Valdaysky District of Novgorod Oblast; administratively incorporated as a town of district significance

Rural localities
Valday, Republic of Karelia, a settlement in Segezhsky District of the Republic of Karelia